The 1909 Georgetown Blue and Gray football team represented Georgetown University during the 1909 college football season. Led by William Newman in his second year as head coach, the team went 3–2–1.

Schedule

References

Georgetown
Georgetown Hoyas football seasons
Georgetown Blue and Gray football